Humbert Aviation is a French aircraft manufacturer based in Ramonchamp. The company specializes in the design and manufacture of microlight aircraft in the form of ready-to-fly aircraft for the Fédération Aéronautique Internationale microlight category.

The company currently markets two designs, the enclosed cockpit, high-wing, two-seats in side-by-side configuration Humbert Tétras and the open cockpit, high-wing, tandem two-seat Humbert La Moto Du Ciel. Both designs have been in production for many years. The aircraft both use welded 4130 steel tube construction with aluminium sheet covered wings and fabric-covered tail surfaces. The fuselage of the Tétras is also fabric-covered.

Aircraft

References

External links

Aircraft manufacturers of France
Ultralight aircraft
Homebuilt aircraft
Companies based in Grand Est